The following is a list of the lieutenant governors of Quebec. Though the present day office of the lieutenant governor in Quebec came into being only upon the province's entry into Canadian Confederation in 1867, the post is a continuation from the first governorship of New France in 1627, through the governor generalcy of New France, and the governorship of the Province of Quebec. From 1786 to 1841, the Governors General of The Canadas simultaneously acted as the direct governor of Lower Canada, only occasionally appointing a lieutenant to act in their stead.

Lieutenant governors of the Province of Quebec, 1760–1791

Lieutenant governors of Lower Canada, 1791–1841

Lieutenant governors of Quebec, 1867–present

See also
 Office-holders of Canada
 Canadian incumbents by year

References

External links
 

Quebec
Lieutenant governors